Anselm Audley (born 1982) is a British fantasy writer.

Early life and career
Anselm Audley was born to Paul and Elizabeth Aston, and has a sister. His mother was also a novelist. He is a college graduate of Ancient and Modern History, but he started writing his epic Aquasilva novels when still a pupil at school. He finished his first novel at the age of 17.

The Aquasilva Trilogy has been translated into German, French, Italian, Spanish and Dutch. Library Journal announced that, from Simon & Schuster U.K., Audley received one of the largest advances ever paid to a new British fantasy author.

Vespera, a sequel to the Aquasilva Trilogy, was released on 13 November 2007 and electronically published in English.

Envoy, a short story happening during Attila the Hun's invasion of the Roman Empire, published as part of the Foreworld Saga. It was released on 26 June 2013.

The Day Democracy Died, his first non-fiction piece. This narrative history work tells how hysteria doomed Athens' democracy. It was released on 28 October 2014.

The Aquasilva Trilogy

Heresy (2001) is set within the stormy waterworld of Aquasilva. Aquasilva is controlled by the Domain, a religious power dedicated to the element fire. The Domain, however, is confronted by many forces of change. One of these unknowing change agents is Cathan, son of the count from Lepidor. Upon discovering iron on their territory, Cathan leaves his home to inform his father of this important find. During his journey Cathan stumbles upon a plot to unleash a new age of fundamentalism. New friends and new powers enable Cathan to confront this extremism.
Inquisition (2002) is the second volume in the Aquasilva Trilogy. After the battle that restored Lepidor to freedom, Cathan sets off on his travels again to find an answer to the storm-magic he used to save his clan. In the process he soon discovers a new secret that will change his life forever.
Crusade (2003) is the final work in the Aquasilva Trilogy. In this book Cathan finally discovers who he is. At the same time, religious fanatics of the Domain continue to seek out heresy and Cathan in particular.

Bibliography
 Aquasilva Trilogy
 Heresy (2001)
 Inquisition (2002)
 Crusade (2003)
 Vespera (2007)
 Envoy (2013)
 The Day Democracy Died (2014)

References

External links
Review of the trilogy by Infinity Plus
 Heresy review at FantasyLiterature.net

Vespera in e-book format

1982 births
English fantasy writers
Living people